Keezhpadam Kumaran Nair (1916–2007) was a Kathakali artists from Kerala, India. Endowed and equip with a life profile that also show him to several traditional Indian performing arts other than Kathakali, his stage presentation infused a fresh breath into the four-century-old art form, thanks also to his broad and deep view about the Puranas (Indian mythology) that spurred from a constant pursuit of knowledge through reading books and engaging in talks in scholars.

Kumaran Nair was one of the very few Kathakali artists to have had directly interacted with allied art forms like Bharatanatyam from south India and Kathak from the north of his country besides also Odissi from the eastern belt. This was besides a brush he had with Tamil cinema in his youthful days in Madras (Chennai). All these never conspired to shed the element of classicism in Kumaran Nair's Kathakali performances, instead helped his acting-dancing techniques acquire a certain grand eclecticism that won him fans across Kerala and elsewhere. In short, Kumaran Nair's style was a mix of intellect, imagination and signature body language that took care not to breach or dilute the pure grammar of Kathakali all the same.

A native of Vellinezhi, one of Kathakali's nerve-centres in Palakkad district, Kumaran Nair was primarily groomed—from as early as the age of five—in the highly evolved Kalluvazhi style by none other than its grand master, Pattikkamthodi Ravunni Menon. His classmates at Kerala Kalamandalam included the legendary Kalamandalam Krishnan Nair (1914–1990), but on completion of his studies found the conditions in Kerala did not exactly promise a bright future for him as a Kathakali artiste.

Much to the sorrow of his guru Pattikkamthodi, Kumaran Nair shifted base to Madras, where he gained name a master of choreography by teaching dance (for songs) to Tamil cine star Ranjan. During this span, Kumaran Nair also worked closely with the film icon M.G. Ramachandran, who later switched over to politics and became the state's chief minister.

He soon returned to Kalamandalam as a teacher, where circumstances subsequently forced him to work with the dance section. An unhappy Kumaran Nair quit his alma-mater. He later worked with several Kathakali schools like PSV Natyasangham, Kottakkal; Kalasadanam, Chunangad and Varanakkottu Kaliyogam, Payyannur; but his longest stints were in Gandhi Seva Sadan (Sadanam Kathakali and Classical Arts Academy) at Peroor in Palakkad district and the International Centre for Kathakali in New Delhi. Kumaran Nair is a recipient of the Padma Shri award (2004), the Central Sangeet Natak Akademi award, the Kerala Sangeetha Nataka Akademi Award (1976), the Kerala Sangeetha Nataka Akademi Fellowship (1996) and the Kalamandalam award, among others.

Kumaran Nair retired from stage three years before his death in 2007, and led a totally reclusive life in his house in a quite, northern corner of his native Vellinezhi.

References 

Recipients of the Padma Shri in arts
Dancers from Kerala
1916 births
2007 deaths
Kathakali exponents
People from Palakkad district
Indian male dancers
Recipients of the Sangeet Natak Akademi Award
Recipients of the Kerala Sangeetha Nataka Akademi Fellowship
Recipients of the Kerala Sangeetha Nataka Akademi Award